Pudendal plexus can refer to:
 Pudendal plexus (nerves)
 Pudendal plexus (veins)